Collections from the Whiteout is the fourth studio album by British singer-songwriter Ben Howard, released on 26 March 2021.

Singles
The lead single from the album, "What a Day", premiered on Annie Mac's BBC Radio 1 show on 26 January 2021. A second single "Crowhurst's Meme" was released 2 February 2021. The third and fourth singles, "Far Out" and "Follies Fixture" were released on 26 February 2021. The fifth single, "Sorry Kid" premiered on Annie Mac’s show on 22 March 2021.

Critical reception

The album was met with positive reviews from music critics. On Metacritic, which assigns a rating out of 100, the album was scored a 69, which indicates generally favourable reviews. Ben Lynch of DIY Magazine gave the album 4 stars, calling the album "Melancholy, meticulous and achingly grand", elaborating that "His dialling down the traditional guitar/vocal folk and diving deeper into a range of electronics, whether the harsh distortion of ‘Sage That She Was Burning’ or the bright, tactile ‘Metaphysical Cantations’, is a primary deviation here. ‘Follies Fixture’, the opener and a highlight, expresses this newfound path from the onset, its entrancing swirl likely to divide fans while potentially turning a few new heads his way. Make no mistake though, Collections From The Whiteout remains in the truest sense a Ben Howard release." The Independent's Roisin O'Connor and Rachel Brodsky say that "instead of a too-many-cooks situation, which this easily could’ve been, [producer Aaron Dessner] and Howard find cozy nooks for everyone. The singer’s reedy voice is the drawstring that ties it all together." Hannah Jocelyn of Pitchfork gave the album 6.9 out of 10, saying that "Whiteout doesn’t always sound like a revelation, but it allows Howard to open up, letting in new lyrical and musical ideas that complement his own without overwhelming them."

Other reviews were less positive. John Murphy of musicOMH.com gave the album 3 stars, explaining that "there’s certainly a lot to take in on Ben Howard’s fourth album – not all the ideas work in fairness, and there’s a few too many moments which feel like half-sketched ideas. Yet Dessner makes a decent foil for him and for those who have joined Howard on his career journey to date will be more than happy to continue travelling with him." PopMatters' Brice Ezell gave the album 6 out of 10, saying that "if Whiteout is an imperfect album, it is one that also evinces Howard’s refusal to stay in a single musical lane."

Commercial performance
Collections from the Whiteout spent its first week of release at number one on the UK Albums Chart (with first-week sales of 15,621 copies, including 1,759 from sales-equivalent streams). Unusually for a number one album, it recorded no other weeks in the chart.

Track listing

Personnel
Credits are adapted from the album's liner notes.

Musicians
 Ben Howard – primary artist, guitar, producer
 Aaron Dessner – producer, guitar, piano
 Mickey Smith – acoustic guitar, dulcimer
 Nat Wason – electric guitar
 Richard Thomas – keyboard, synthesizer
 Ryan Olson – sound effects
 Rob Moose – viola, violin 
 James Krivchenia – drums, percussion
 Yussef Dayes – drums
 Kate Stables – vocals 
 Thomas Bartlett – synthesizer
 India Bourne – cello
 Jason Treuting – drums, percussion
 Kyle Keegan – drums

Production
 Jonathan Low – engineer, mixing
 Greg Calbi – mastering
 Roddy Bow – artwork

Charts

References 

2018 albums
Ben Howard albums
Island Records albums
Albums produced by Aaron Dessner